The Kingdom of Breifne or Bréifne, anglicized as Breffny, was a medieval overkingdom in Gaelic Ireland. It comprised what is now County Leitrim, County Cavan and parts of neighbouring counties, and corresponds roughly to the Roman Catholic Diocese of Kilmore. It had emerged by the 10th century, as a confederation of  headed by an overking drawn from the Uí Briúin Bréifne.

By the 11th century, Bréifne was ruled by the Ua Ruairc (O'Rourke) dynasty. The kingdom reached the height of its power in the 12th century, under Tigernán Ua Ruairc. During the latter part of his reign, Bréifne took part in campaigns against the Norman invasion of Ireland. His assassination by the Anglo-Normans in 1172 was followed by a succession dispute, and a conflict between the Ua Ruairc and Ua Raghallaigh (O'Reilly) dynasties.

Following the Battle of Magh Slecht in 1256, Bréifne split into West Breifne (ruled by the Ua Ruairc) and East Breifne (ruled by the Ua Raghallaigh).

Bréifne was part of the province of Connacht until the reign of Queen Elizabeth I. In that time it was shired into the modern counties Cavan and Leitrim, Leitrim remaining a part of the province of Connacht while Cavan became part of Ulster.

History 

 is said to derive from an obsolete Irish word meaning "hilly", a description which describes the topography of this part of Ireland. But this derivation is opposed by the likes of O'Connell and MacEoin. It was referred to as the rough third of Connacht. She was slain by Regan after whom Tomregan is supposedly named.

In ancient times the area that became known as Bréifne was said to be occupied by the Erdini, called in Irish 'Ernaigh', who possessed the entire country bordering Lough Erne.

At the time of the Christianization of Ireland (c. 5th–6th century), groups believed to be in or near Breifne included the Glasraighe, Masraige, Dartraige, Armhaighe, Gallraighe, the Fir Manach, and the Gailenga.

Around the 6th century, a people known as the Conmaicne Rein are thought to have moved north from around the present Dunmore in County Galway and settled in Magh Rein (the area around Fenagh). From here they peopled what is now South Leitrim, which became known as Magh Rein, and its inhabitants as the Conmaicne Magh Rein.
They consisted of different family groupings – Muintir Eolais, Muintir Cearbhallain (O Mulvey), and Cinel Luachain, among others.

About the 8th century, the area since known as Breifne was conquered and settled by the Uí Briúin Bréifne who were a branch of the royal family of Connacht. The Uí Briúin established themselves first in modern county Leitrim and then into what is now County Cavan. It can be argued that there is no contemporary evidence to support these speculations.

By the 9th century, the Ó Ruaircs had established themselves as kings of Breifne.

In the 10th and 11th centuries, the Ó Ruairc kings of Breifne fought some battles for the title of king of Connacht, with four different kings of Breifne gaining the title.

During the 12th century the reign of Tighearnán Ua Ruairc, the kingdom of Breifne was said to comprise most of the modern counties of Leitrim and Cavan, and parts of Longford, Meath, Fermanagh and Sligo.

In the 16th century Breifne O'Rourke eventually became County Leitrim and Breifne O'Reilly became County Cavan.

Territories 
The following territories were at one stage part of Breifne.
 Cenél Cairpre (Cairbre) – northern County Sligo and northeast County Leitrim. The territory of Coirpre, son of Niall of the Nine Hostages, around the 6th century extended from the Drowes west to the Owenmore River in Ballysadare.

Duncarbry (Dun Chairbre) marks the border of Cairbre's territory on the Drowes, while the Barony of Carbury in North Sligo still reminds us also today.

Noted chiefs of Cenél Cairpre included Ó Maolchloiche (O'Mulclohy).

 Cairpre Gabra – northern County Longford, barony of Granard. Ó Ronáin (O'Ronan) were lords in the barony of Granard until dispossessed by the Ó Fearghails in the 13th century.

According to the Annals of the Four Masters, about 476 AD, the Battle of Granard was fought by Eochaidh, son of Cairbre, son of Oilioll, son of Dunlaing, son of Enda Niadh against the Ui Dunlainge, Ui Briúin Cualann and Ui Fergusa of North Leinster.

 Cenél Laegaire – County Fermanagh. The Fir Manach, the Cinéal Eanna and the Cenél Laegaire were early indigenous tribes in the County Fermanagh area. The Cenél Laegairi mic Neill were noted west of Loch Erne (Book of Lecan). The Cenél Laegairi mic Neill were also noted in central Ireland (Mide, Meath).

Kings of Breifne 
Note: Where mentioned spelling used in the document is used here.

Early kings 
 Echu Mugmedón, father to Brión, Fiachra, and Niall (of the Nine Hostages).
 Brión: son of Echu Mugmedón and the ancestor of the Uí Briúin Kings of Connacht.
 Aodh Fionn mac Fergna: king of Breifne
 Maenach mac Báithin: king of Ui Briuin Breifne – c.653
 Dub Dothra: king of the Ui Briuin & Conmaicne & Breifne – c.743
 Cormacc mac Duibh Dá Críoch: king of Breifni – c.790
 Muircheartach mac Donnghal, king of Breifne: c.800–806
 Mael Dúin mac Échtgal, king of Breifne: died 822
 Ceallach son of Cearnach, son of Dubh Dothra, king of Breifne
 Tighearnán mac Seallachan, king of Breifne: c.888 – father of Ruarc
 Ruarc mac Tighearnáin, lord of Ui Briuin Breifne: c. 893 – grandfather of Sean Fergal
 Flann mac Tighearnáin, lord of Breifne: c.910
 Cernachan mac Tighearnáin, king of Breifne: died 931
 Conghalach mac Cathaláin, lord of Breifne: c.935
 Cléircén son of Tigernán, king of Bréifne: C. 937
 Fergal? ua Ruairc, king of Bréifne

Ó Ruairc dynasty, Kings of Bréifne, c. 964–1257 
 (Sean) Fergal Ó Ruairc king of Connacht and Breifne: c.964–67
 Niall Ó Ruairc, heir of Breifne: 1000–1001
 Aedh Ó Ruairc, king of Breifne: died 1014–1015 – son of Fergal
 Art an caileach Ó Ruairc, king of Breifne: c.1020–1030? – son of Fergal
 Aedh Ó Ruairc, lord of Dartraige: 1029
 Art uallach (oirdnidhe) Ó Ruairc, king of Connacht and Breifne: c.1030–1046 – son of Aedh mac Fergal
 Niall Ó Ruairc, king of Breifne Connacht: 1047 – son of Art uallach
 Domnall Ó Ruairc, lord of Breifne: c.1057 – son of Niall
 Cathal Ó Ruairc, lord of Breifne: c.1051–1059 – son of Tighernan
 Aedh in Gilla Braite Ó Ruairc, king of Breifne: 1066 – son of Niall, son of Art Uallach
 Aed Ó Ruairc, king of Connacht & Breifne: c.1067–1087 – son of Art Uallach
 Donnchadh cael Ó Ruairc, king of Breifne: c.1084 – son of Art an caileach
 Ualgharg Ó Ruairc, royal heir of Connacht: 1085 – son of Niall, son of Art uallach
 Donnchadh Ó Ruairc, lord of Ui Briuin and Conmaicne: 1101 – son of Art Uí Ruairc
 Domnall Ó Ruairc, king of Connacht and Breifne: c.1095–1102 – son of Tigernán son of Ualgharg
 Cathal Ó Ruairc, lord of Ui Briuin Breifne and Gailenga: 1105 – son of Gilla Braite, son of Tigernán
 Domnall Ó Ruairc, lord of Ui Briúin: c.1108 – son of Donnchadh
 Aedh an Gilla Sronmaol Ó Ruairc king of Conmaicne: c.1117–1122 – son of Domnall (or Donnchadh).
 Tigernán mór Ó Ruairc, king of Breifne: c.1124–1152, 1152–1172 – son of Donnchad macDomnail
 Aedh Ó Ruairc, king of Breifne: 1152–1152, 1172–1176 – son of Gilla Bruide, son of Domnall
 Amlaíb Ó Ruairc, king of Breifne: 1176–1184 – son of Fergal, son of Domnall, son of Tigernán
 Aedh Ó Ruairc, king of Breifne: 1184–1187 – son of Máelsechlann, son of Tigernán mór
 Domnall Ó Ruairc, lord of the greater part of Breifne: c.1207 – son of Ferghal mac Domnall, son of Fergal
 Ualgarg Ó Ruairc, king of Breifne: c.1196–1209 – son of Cathal, son of Aedh, son of Donnchadh
 Art Ó Ruairc, king of Bréifne: 1209–1210 – son of Domnall, son of Fergal, son of Domnall
 Niall O'Ruairc, king of Dartry and clann Fermaige: 1228 – son of Congalach, son of Fergal, son of Domnall
 Ualgarg Ó Ruairc, king of Breifne: c.1210–1231 – son of Cathal, son of Aedh, son of Donnchadh
 Cathal riabach O'Ruairc, king of Bréifne: 1231–1236 – son of Donnchadh, son of Aedh, son of Gilla Braite
 Conchobar O'Ruairc, king of Bréifne: 1250?–1257 – son of Tigernán, son of Domnall, son of Cathal

Lords of Bréifne Ó Ruairc, 1257–1605 
 Sitric Ó Ruairc, king of Bréifne: elected and killed 1257–1257 – son of Ualgarg, son of Cathal
 Amlaíb Ó Ruairc, king of Breifne West: 1257–1258 – son of Art, son of Domnall, son of Fergal
 Domnall Ó Ruairc, king of Breifne: 1258 to 1258 (deposed) – son of Conchobar, son of Tigernán
 Art Ó Ruairc, king of Breifne East: 1258–1259 (deposed) – son of Cathal riabach, son of Donnchadh
 Domnall Ó Ruairc, king of Breifne: 1259 to 1260 (killed) – son of Conchobar son of Tigernán
 Art Bec Ó Ruairc, king of Breifne West: 1260–1260 (killed) – son of Art son of Domnall son of Fergal
 Art Ó Ruairc, king of Breifne: 1261–1266 (deposed)– son of Cathal riabach son of Donnchadh
 Conchobar Buide Ó Ruairc, king of Breifne: 1266–1273 – son of Amlaíb, son of Art
 Tigernán Ó Ruairc, king of Breifne: 1273–1274 – son of Aedh, son of Ualgarg, son of Cathal
 Art Ó Ruairc, king of Breifne: 1275–1275 – son of Cathal riabach, son of Donnchadh
 Amlaib Ó Ruairc, king of Breifne: 1275?–1307 – son of Art, son of Cathal riabach
 Domnall Carrach Ó Ruairc, king of Breifne: 1307–1311 – son of Amlaíb, son of Art
 Ualgarg Mór Ó Ruairc, king of Breifne: 1316–1346 – son of Domnall carrach
 Flaithbheartach Ó Ruairc, king of Breifne: 1346–1349 (deposed) – son of Domnall carrach
 Aodh Bán Ó Ruairc, king of Breifne: 1349–1352 – son of Ualgarg mór, son of Domnall
 Flaithbheartach Ó Ruairc, king of Breifne: 1352–1352 (died) – son of Domnall carrach
 Tadgh na gcoar O'Rourke, king of Breifne: 1352–1376 – son of Ualgarg mór son of Domnall carrach
 Gilla Crist Ó Ruairc, lord of Breifny: died 1378 – son of Ualgarg mór, son of Domnall carrach
 Tigernán mór Ó Ruairc, king of Breifne: 1376–1418 – son of Ualgarg mór, son of Domnall carrach
 Aodh buidhe Ó Ruairc, king of Breifne: 1418–1419 – son of Tigernán mór
 Tadhg Ó Ruairc, king of West Breifne: 1419–1424 – son of Tigernán mór
 Art Ó Ruairc, king of East Breifne: 1419–1424 – son of Tadhg na gcoar
 Tadhg Ó Ruairc, king of Breifne: 1424–1435 – son of Tigernán mór
 Lochlann Ó Ruairc, king of East Breifne: 1435–1458 – son of Tadhg na gcoar
 Donnchadh bacagh Ó Ruairc, king of West Breifne: 1435–1445 – son of Tigernán mór?
 Donnchadh Ó Ruairc, king of West Breifne: 1445–1449 – son of Tigernán óg, son of Tigernán mór
 Tigernán óg Ó Ruairc, king of Breifne: 1449–1468 – son of Tadhg, son of Tigernán mór
 Donnchadh losc Ó Ruairce, king of Breifne: 1468–1476 – son of Tigernán mór, son of Ualgarg mór
 Domnall Ó Ruairc, king of Breifne: 1468–1476, – son of Tadhg, son of Tigernán mór
 Feidhlimidh Ó Ruairc, king of Breifne: 1476–1500 – son of Donnchadh son of Tigernán óg
 Eóghan Ó Ruairc, king of Breifne: 1500–1528 – son of Tigernán óg son of Tadhg
 Feidhlimidh Ó Ruairc, king of Breifne: 1528–1536 – son of Feidhlimidh, son of Donnchadh
 Brian ballach mór Ó Ruairc, king of Bréifne, 1528–1559, 1560–1562 – son of Eóghan, son of Tigernán óg
 Tadhg Ó Ruairc, king of Breifne: 1559–1560 – son of Brian ballach
 Aodh gallda Ó Ruairc, king of Breifne: 1562–1564 – son of Brian ballach
 Aodh buidhe Ó Ruairc, king of Breifne: 1564–1566 – son of Brian ballach
 Brian na múrtha O'Rourke, king of Breifne: 1566–1591 – son of Brian ballach
 Brian óg na samhthach O'Rourke, king of Breifne: 1591–1600 – son of Brian na múrtha
 Tadhg Ó Ruairc, lord of Breifne: 1600–1605 – son of Brian na múrtha

Lords of Bréifne Ó Raghallaigh (Muintir Maelmordha) 
 Godfrey Ua Raghallaigh, lord of Muintir-Maelmordha: 1161
 Cathal Ua Raghallaigh, lord of Muintir-Maelmordha: 1161–1162 – son of Godfrey
 Fergal son of Cu Chonnacht O'Raigillig, King of Dartry and Clann Fermaige: 1239
 Cathal Ua Raghallaigh, lord of Muintir-Maelmordha: 1256
 Con Ua Raghallaigh, chief of Muintir-Maelmordha: 1256–1257
 Matha Ua Raghallaigh, lord of Muintir-Maelmordha: 1282
 Ferghal O'Raigillig, East Breifne: 1282–1293
 Gilla-Isa Ruaid O'Raigillig, East Breifne: ↑1327 or 1330
 Matha son of Gilla-Isa O'Raigillig, East Breifne: 1304
 Mael Sechlainn O'Raigillig, East Breifne: 1328
 Richard [Risderd] O'Reilly, East Breifne: 1349–1346 or 1349
 Cu Chonnacht O'Reilly, East Breifne: 1362 or 1365 (resigned) – son of Gilla-Isa Ruaid
 Philip O'Reilly, East Breifne: 1365–1366/69 (deposed) – son of Gilla-Isa Ruaid
 Magnus O'Reilly, East Breifne: 1366/69–1366/69 (deposed)
 Philip O'Reilly, East Breifne: 1366/69–1384 – son of Gilla-Isu Ruaid
 Thomas, son of Mathgamain Ua Raighillaigh, king of Muinter-Mailmordha: 1384–1390
 John, son of Philip O'Reilly, East Breifne: 1390–1400 – son of Philip, son of Gilla-Isa-Ruaid
 Gilla-Isa son of Anrig O'Raigillig, East Breifne: 1400–1400
 Maelmordha, son of Cuconnaught O'Reilly, Muintir Reilly: 1403–1411 – son of Cu Chonnacht, son of Gilla-Isa Ruaid
 Richard, son of Thomas O'Reilly, East Breifne: 1411–1418
 Owen, son of John O'Reilly, Muintir-Maelmordha: 1418–1449
 Farrell, son of Thomas O'Reilly, Muintir-Maelmordha: 1450 (deposed) – (AM1450)
 John, son of Owen O'Reilly, Muintir-Maelmordha: 1450–1460 – son of Owen, son of John, son of Philip, son of Gilla-Isa-Roe
 Cathal O'Reilly, Muintir-Maelmordha: 1467
 Turlough, son of John O'Reilly, East Breifne: 1468–1487 – son of John, son of Owen
 John, son of Turlough O'Reilly, East Breifne: 1487–1491
 John, son of Cathal O'Reilly, East Breifne: 1491–1510 – son of Cathal, son of Owen son of John
 Hugh, son of Cathal O'Reilly, East Breifne: 1514
 Owen, son of Cathal O'Reilly, East Breifne:1526
 Farrell, son of John O'Reilly, East Breifne & Conmaicne: 1526–1536 – son of John, son of Cathal
 Maelmordha, son of John O'Reilly, East Breifne: 1537–1565 – son of John, son of Cathal
 Hugh Conallagh O'Reilly, son of Maelmordha O'Reilly, East Breifne: 1583 – son of Maelmordha, son of John
 John Roe, son of Hugh Conallagh O'Reilly, East Breifne: 1583–1596
 Philip, son of Hugh O'Reilly, East Breifne: 1596–1596
 Edmond, son of Maelmordha O'Reilly, East Breifne: 1596–1601 – son of Maelmordha, son of John, son of Cathal
 Owen, son of Hugh Conallagh O'Reilly, East Breifne: 1601–1609

Modern Breifne 
The Prince of Breifne is a courtesy title given to the Chieftain O'Rourke in 1994 by the Office of the Chief Herald of Ireland. In 2003, however, the Chief Herald stopped giving out courtesy titles due to a scandal over the MacCarthy Mór.

Princes of Breifne 
Geoffrey Philip Colmb O'Rorke, Chieftain O'Rourke, Prince from 1994 to the current.
Joseph Martin O'Reilly, Chieftain O'Reilly, Prince from 2017 to the current as Lord of East Breifne. Lord Martin comes from the line of Breifne O’Reilly, from the specific place (in Cavan) of that Royal House. He is a senior member of the noble/royal family O’Reilly of Breifne (Breifne Ua Raighaillaigh) and is an approved member of several royal/noble courts around the world.

See also
 Gaelic nobility of Ireland
 Bélchú
 Beara-Breifne Way
 https://royalcourtofbreifne.org/ Royal Court of Breifne

Notes

References 
 
 "The Adventures of Sir Lancelot du Lac in Breifne, Ireland", by Tom Smith
 Annals of Connacht
 Annals of the Four Masters
 Annals of Tigernach
 Annals of Ulster
 Annals of Innisfallen
 
 Chronicon Scotorum
 
 in Martin; Moody (1984)
 in Martin; Moody (1984)
 O'Duignan, Manus. (late 14th century). Book of Ballymote. On microfilm in Irish national archives.
 
 Cú Choigcríche Ó Cléirigh [Book of Genealogies]. (1642). On microfilm in Irish national archives.
 Mac Fhirbhisigh, Dubhaltach Óg. Leabhar na nGenealach 1650–1666. On microfilm in Irish national archives.
 
 https://royalcourtofbreifne.org/

Further reading 

A 9th century Uí Briúin settlement in County Cavan
 

Breifne
Connachta
Gaelic-Irish nations and dynasties
States and territories established in the 9th century
Former kingdoms in Ireland